The internal iliac artery (formerly known as the hypogastric artery) is the main artery of the pelvis.
Supply Biceps femoris and quadriceps femoris

Structure
The internal iliac artery supplies the walls and viscera of the pelvis, the buttock, the reproductive organs, and the medial compartment of the thigh. The vesicular branches of the internal iliac arteries supply the bladder.

It is a short, thick vessel, smaller than the external iliac artery, and about 3 to 4 cm in length.

Course
The internal iliac artery arises at the bifurcation of the common iliac artery, opposite the lumbosacral articulation, and, passing downward to the upper margin of the greater sciatic foramen, divides into two large trunks, an anterior and a posterior.

It is posterior to the ureter, anterior to the internal iliac vein, anterior to the lumbosacral trunk, and anterior to the piriformis muscle. Near its origin, it is medial to the external iliac vein, which lies between it and the psoas major muscle. It is above the obturator nerve.

Branches
The arrangement of branches of the internal iliac artery is extremely variable. Typically, the artery divides into an anterior division and a posterior division, with the posterior division giving rise to the superior gluteal, iliolumbar, and lateral sacral arteries. The rest usually arise from the anterior division. Because it is variable, an artery may not be a direct branch, but instead might arise off a direct branch.

In recent years the devolopement of techniques like Prostate artery embolisation and angiografy led to an increased understanding of the prostate vascularisation. Regarding the arterial supply M. de Assis et al has suggested an anatomic classification for the origin of the inferior vesical artery 

The following are the branches of internal iliac artery:

Anastamoses 
In individuals assigned female at birth, the ovarian artery (a branch of the abdominal aorta) and uterine arteries form an anastomoses.

Fetal structure
In the fetus, the internal iliac artery is twice as large as the external iliac, and is the direct continuation of the common iliac. It ascends along the side of the bladder, and runs upward on the back of the anterior wall of the abdomen to the umbilicus, converging toward its fellow of the opposite side.

Having passed through the umbilical opening, the two arteries, now termed umbilical, enter the umbilical cord, where they coil around the umbilical vein, and ultimately ramify in the placenta.

At birth, when the placental circulation ceases, the pelvic portion only of the umbilical artery remains patent gives rise to the superior vesical artery (or arteries) of the adult; the remainder of the vessel is converted into a solid fibrous cord, the medial umbilical ligament (otherwise known as the obliterated hypogastric artery) which extends from the pelvis to the umbilicus.

Variation
In two-thirds of a large number of cases, the length of the internal iliac varied between 2.25 and 3.4 cm.; in the remaining third it was more frequently longer than shorter, the maximum length being about 7 cm. the minimum about 1 cm.

The lengths of the common iliac and internal iliac arteries bear an inverse proportion to each other, the internal iliac artery being long when the common iliac is short, and vice versa.

The place of division of the internal iliac artery varies between the upper margin of the sacrum and the upper border of the greater sciatic foramen.

The right and left hypogastric arteries in a series of cases often differed in length, but neither seemed constantly to exceed the other.

Common branching variations

Collateral circulation
The circulation after ligature of the internal iliac artery is carried on by the anastomoses of: 
 the iliolumbar artery (from the posterior division of the internal iliac artery) with the last lumbar artery (from the aorta)
 the iliolumbar artery (from the posterior division of the internal iliac artery) with the superficial circumflex iliac artery (from the femoral)
 the lateral sacral arteries (from the posterior division of the internal iliac artery) with the median sacral artery (from the aorta)
 the superior gluteal artery (from the posterior division of the internal iliac artery) with the superficial circumflex iliac artery (from the femoral)
 the inferior gluteal artery (from the anterior division of the internal iliac artery) with the profunda femoris artery (from the femoral)
 the obturator artery (from the anterior division of the internal iliac artery) with the inferior epigastric artery (from the external iliac artery)
 the obturator artery (from the anterior division of the internal iliac artery) with the medial circumflex femoral artery (from the profunda femoris artery)
 the middle rectal artery (from the anterior division of the internal iliac artery) and the superior rectal artery (a branch of the inferior mesenteric artery)
 the uterine arteries (from the anterior division of the internal iliac artery) and the ovarian arteries (from the aorta)

Additional images

See also
 External iliac artery
 Internal iliac vein

References

External links
 
 
 
 Illustration at wiseowl.com
 "Variation in Origin of the Parietal Branches of internal iliac artery based on a study of 169 Specimens (108 males and 61 females)." at anatomyatlases.org
 
 

Arteries of the abdomen